Ziba Mir-Hosseini (born 3 April 1952) is an Iranian-born legal anthropologist, specialising in Islamic law, gender and development. She received her PhD in anthropology from Cambridge University and is the author of several books on Islam, gender, and the family.

She has also directed two documentary films, Runaway and Divorce Iranian Style.

Biography
Born to Iranian parents, Mir-Hosseini is fluent in English, French, and Persian, and is familiar with Arabic and Kurdish. She received her bachelor's degree in Sociology from Tehran University in 1974, and completed her PhD in Social anthropology in 1980 from the University of Cambridge. Mir-Hosseini's doctoral thesis was written about an ethnographic fieldwork in 1977 in Kalardasht, a tourist district in Iran, about how tourism and a changing economy both impacted traditional Iranian family life, and is titled "Changing Aspects of Economic and Family Structures in Kalardasht, a District of Northern Iran." Mir-Hosseini specialises in Islamic law, gender, and development and is a member of the Council of Women Living under Muslim Laws.

Mir-Hosseini is an expert on Iranian affairs, Islamic family law, and women in the Muslim world. She frequents radio and TV programs all over the world, has been studied on many TV documentaries on Iran, participates in panel discussions and projects in the US, UK and other countries and has published various works.

In 2000, Mir-Hosseini was a jury member of San Francisco International Film Festival and became a jury member for International Human Rights Documentary Film Festival. In 2003, Mir-Hosseini became a jury member of Amnesty International DOEN Award for the best film on human rights, International Documentary Film Festival Amsterdam (IDFA).
In 2015, she received the Martin E. Marty Award for the Public Understanding of Religion.

Further reading
Women's Islamic Initiative in Spirituality and Equality. N.p.. Web. 2 May 2013.
Islam and Gender: The Religious Debate in Contemporary Iran N.d. Photograph. Princeton University PressWeb. 2 May 2013.
"Ziba Mir-Hosseini | Religion, Politics, and Globalization Program". Religion, Politics, and Globalization Program. N.p., n.d. Web. 3 May 2013.
"Ziba Mir-Hosseini." Ziba MirHosseini. N.p., n.d. Web. 2 May 2013.
"The Politics of Gender and Democracy in Iran: Between Rights and Honor | NIDemocracy ." Nonviolent Initiative for Democracy . N.p., n.d. Web. 3 May 2013.

References

External links
 
 Profile at University of California, Berkeley
 

1952 births
Living people
Alumni of the University of Cambridge
Iranian anthropologists
Iranian women anthropologists
Iranian Shia scholars of Islam
Women scholars of Islam
Proponents of Islamic feminism